Laich-kwil-tach (also spelled Ligwilda'xw), is the Anglicization of the Kwak'wala autonomy by the "Southern Kwakiutl" people of Quadra Island and Campbell River in British Columbia, Canada.  There are today two main groups (of perhaps five original separate groups): the Wei Wai Kai (Cape Mudge Band) and Wei Wai Kum just across on the Vancouver Island "mainland" in the town of Campbell River. In addition to these two main groups there are the Kwiakah (Kwiakah Band / Kwiakah First Nation) originally from Phillips Arm and Frederick Arm and the Discovery Islands, the Tlaaluis (Laa'luls) between Bute and Loughborough Inlets—after a great war between the Kwakiutl and the Salish peoples they were so reduced in numbers that they joined the Kwiakah—and the Walitsima / Walitsum Band of Salmon River (also called Hahamatses or Salmon River Band).

So great was the power of the Southern Kwakiutl that the Comox people of the Courtenay-Comox came to speak Kwak'wala instead of K'omox, which today remains spoken by their kin the Sliammon and Homalhko on the other side of Georgia Strait around Powell River.  Many of the Wewaykum in Campbell River are of Comox descent, while the Weewaikai of the Cape Mudge Band retain noble lineages and ceremonies going back centuries to their roots in the Queen Charlotte Strait.  The great potlatches of the Cape Mudge chiefs are celebrated in the book Chiefly Feasts: The Enduring Kwakiutl Potlatch (A. Donaitis, U. Wash Press).

The Southern Kwakiutl remain politically separate from their distant kin, the Kwakwaka'wakw, whose name means speakers of Kwak'wala who remained in the Queen Charlotte Strait.  The Kwagu'ł or Northern Kwakiutl of Fort Rupert are more closely allied and related to the Southern Kwakiutl than are the Kwakwaka'wakw.  The term "Kwakiutl" has different political and historical associations with each of these groups, and has associations with one band in particular over all others, which is one reason why Kwakwaka'wakw evolved as the collective name for the main group of Queen Charlotte Strait Kwak'wala-speakers.  The Southern Kwakiutl have always called themselves Laich-kwil-tach, at least since moving into the Georgia Strait.

Laich-kwil-tach raids on the southern Georgia Strait, Puget Sound, and even up the Fraser River and out into the Strait of Juan de Fuca, and northwards, are described in the annals of the early non-First Nations explorers and traders. There was one notable incident shortly after the founding of Fort Langley in which the Hudson's Bay Company (HBC) staff repelled a siege by the Euclataws (i.e. the Laich-kwil-tach) with cannonades (much earning the appreciation of the beleaguered local Kwantlens).  Despite the presence of Fort Langley the Laich-kwil-tach continued to raid other Sto:lo communities farther up the river.

Notable Ligwilda'wx people
 Sonny Assu, interdisciplinary artist
 Chief Billy Assu

References
Chiefly Feasts: The Enduring Kwakiutl Potlatch Aldona Jonaitis (Editor) U. Washington Press 1991 (also a publication of the American Museum of Natural History)
Bancroft-Hunt, Norman. People of the Totem: The Indians of the Pacific Northwest University of Oklahoma Press, 1988

See also
Kwakwaka'wakw mythology
Kwakwaka'wakw
Kwak'wala

Kwakwaka'wakw

no:Kwakiutl
pl:Kwakwala